Clement Mok (born 1958) is a graphic designer and author.

Mok founded several design-related businesses — Studio Archetype (acquired by Sapient), CMCD and NetObjects, Inc.  In 1997, Mok helped to launch the advertising campaign called "The Internet Guy".  From 1998 until 2001, he was Chief Creative Officer of Sapient. Mok also served as the national president of AIGA and was the creative director at Apple Inc. in the early 1980s. Currently, he leads a new subscription-based royalty-free stock image business and consults on a variety of product development projects.

Information architecture
Mok authored an influential early information architecture manual, Designing Business (Adobe Press, June 1996).

See also
 List of AIGA medalists

Notes

External links
Clement Mok's official site
"Clement Mok takes on the Web" Salon.com
Visualsymbols.com Mok's subscription-based royalty-free stock image business

1958 births
Living people
Interface designers
Canadian graphic designers
Apple Inc. employees
People from Vancouver
AIGA medalists